Community boards of Staten Island are New York City community boards in the borough of Staten Island, which are the appointed advisory groups of the community districts that advise on land use and zoning, participate in the city budget process, and address service delivery in their district.

Community boards are each composed of up to 50 volunteer members appointed by the local borough president, half from nominations by City Council members representing the community district (i.e., whose council districts cover part of the community district). Additionally, all City Council members representing the community district are non-voting, ex officio board members.

History 
The 1963 revision of the New York City Charter extended the Borough of Manhattan's "Community Planning Councils" (est. 1951) to the outer boroughs as "Community Planning Boards", which are now known as "Community Boards".

The 1975 revision of the New York City Charter set the number of Community Districts/Boards to 59, established the position of the district manager for the community districts, and created the Uniform Land Use Review Procedure (ULURP) which gave the community boards the authority to review land use proposals such as zoning actions, and special permits.

Community Districts

Staten Island Borough Board 

The Staten Island Borough Board is composed of the borough president, New York City Council members whose districts are part of the borough, and the chairperson of each community board in the Staten Island.

The current borough board (as of June 2020) is composed of the 7 members listed in the table below:

Other areas 

Within the borough of Staten Island there is one Joint Interest Area (JIA), which is outside of the jurisdiction of individual community districts, and has its own district number. The JIA in Richmond county is:
 District 95 - Staten Island Gateway National Recreation Area, 2010 Census population:762

See also 
 Government of New York City
 List of Staten Island neighborhoods
 New York City Council
 Borough president
 Borough boards of New York City

References

External links 
 Staten Island Community Boards
 BoardStat from BetaNYC

 
Community Boards of Staten Island
Urban planning in New York City